Joel Granfors (born 24 June 2005), is a Swedish racing driver currently competing in the 2023 USF Pro 2000 Championship with Exclusive Autosport. He previously competed in the 2022 GB3 Championship with Fortec Motorsport, taking the runners-up position.

Career

Karting 
Granfors began karting in 2013, in Sweden. Highlights of his 7 year karting career include winning the 2017 MKR Series Sweden in the Junior 60 category, the 2018 SverigeCupen in the OK Junior category, and finishing 6th in the OK Junior category of the 2018 Swedish Karting Championship. He competed in the CIK-FIA Karting European Championship in 2019.

Aquila Synergy Cup Sweden 
Granfors made his car racing debut in the 2019 Aquila Synergy Cup Sweden, where he finished 5th in the standings with 5 wins and 8 podiums.

He continued in the championship in 2020, racing with his family team Granforce Racing alongside his younger brother Linus. With 9 wins and 11 podiums, he won the title.

Formula Nordic 
Granfors competed in the 2020 Formula Nordic Championship with his family team Granforce Racing, where he won the title with 8 wins and 9 podiums.

Aquila Formula 1000 
Granfors competed in the Kinnekulle Ring round of the 2021 Aquila Formula 1000 Championship, driving for Granforce Racing alongside his father Joakim and his brother Linus.

F4 British Championship 
Granfors competed in the 2021 F4 British Championship with Fortec Motorsport. He finished 4th in the standings with 1 win.

GB3 Championship
Granfors moved to the GB3 Championship in 2022, continuing with Fortec Motorsport. He took his maiden victory in the championship in the second round at the Silverstone Circuit.

FIA Formula 3 
In September 2022, Granfors took part in FIA Formula 3 Championship post-season testing at Jerez, taking part in all three days of the test with the Carlin team.

USF Pro 2000 Championship 
For 2023, Granfors moved to America to compete in the 2023 USF Pro 2000 Championship with Exclusive Autosport.

Personal life 
Joel’s younger brother Linus, is also a racing driver, as well as his father Joakim, who also manages the family team, Granforce Racing.

Karting record

Karting career summary

Racing record

Racing career summary 

* Season still in progress.

Complete F4 British Championship results 
(key) (Races in bold indicate pole position) (Races in italics indicate fastest lap)

Complete GB3 Championship results 
(key) (Races in bold indicate pole position) (Races in italics indicate fastest lap)

American open-wheel racing results

USF Pro 2000 Championship 
(key) (Races in bold indicate pole position) (Races in italics indicate fastest lap) (Races with * indicate most race laps led)

*Season still in progress.

References

External links 
 
 

2005 births
Living people
People from Eskilstuna
Swedish racing drivers
British F4 Championship drivers
BRDC British Formula 3 Championship drivers
Sportspeople from Södermanland County
Fortec Motorsport drivers